Michal Meduna  (born 31 August 1981) is a Czech retired footballer.

Career
Meduna has played for several clubs in the Czech Republic and spent time with Vestel Manisaspor in Turkey. While playing there, he suffered a serious heart attack, which caused him to retire from professional football at the age of just 25. After the accident, he played for Sokol Živanice in Czech lower divisions.

References

External links
 TFF Profile
 
 

1981 births
Living people
Czech footballers
Czech Republic youth international footballers
Czech Republic under-21 international footballers
Association football forwards
Czech expatriate footballers
AFK Atlantic Lázně Bohdaneč players
AC Sparta Prague players
SK Slavia Prague players
Manisaspor footballers
Czech First League players
Süper Lig players
Sportspeople from Pardubice
Czech expatriate sportspeople in Turkey
Czech expatriate sportspeople in Austria
Expatriate footballers in Turkey
Expatriate footballers in Austria
1. FC Slovácko players